In June 2014, Wales toured South Africa, playing a 2-test series against the Springboks. In addition to the two Test matches, Wales also played a warm-up uncapped match against domestic club side . The three matches coincided with the June International Window, playing in the second and third week of the window.

Wales entered the test series on the back of 14 consecutive losses to South Africa; the last time Wales won against South Africa was in June 1999, the only time Wales have beaten South Africa. Wales were on 16 consecutive losses to the Southern Hemisphere greats, Australia, New Zealand and South Africa, with the last time they beat a Southern Hemisphere great was in November 2008, and have not won an away match to the Southern Hemisphere greats since 1969.

The 14 consecutive losses to South Africa were extended to 16, while the 16 consecutive losses to the Southern Hemisphere greats were extended to 18 following a 2–0 series defeat. During the test series, Wales and South Africa contested the Prince William Cup, which South Africa retained with the series victory. It was the seventh time South Africa won the trophy to Wales' zero.

Fixtures

Matches

Eastern Province Kings

Notes:
 George North was ruled out of the match, as he was still suffering from a virus hours before kick-off. No other player replaced him in the match-day 23.

First test

Notes:
 Cornal Hendricks and Lood de Jager made their international debuts for South Africa.
 Victor Matfield joined John Smit as the most capped South African player with 111 caps.
 Gareth Davies and Matthew Morgan made their international debuts for Wales.
 Adam Jones played his 100th test match; 95 for Wales and 5 for the British and Irish Lions.

Second test

Notes:
 Victor Matfield surpassed John Smit, to become South Arica's most capped player with 112 caps.
 South Africa retain the Prince William Cup for the seventh time.

Squads

Wales
Before the tour, the Welsh Rugby Union announced that on 30 May, a Wales senior trial match would take place at the Liberty Stadium in Swansea, the first of its kind in 14 years. The failure of the Welsh regions to qualify for the 2013–14 Pro12 play-offs meant that, for many of the players, there would be a five-week gap between the end of the season and the first Test. The teams were announced on 13 May, with the Probables squad to be coached by Rob Howley, and the Possibles squad by Robin McBryde. The match fell outside the international window, so players based outside Wales were not required to be released to play, in accordance with IRB regulations. No players based in England were released for the match, while all the France-based players selected for the match except Dan Lydiate ended up participating.

Trial match

Note: Bold text denotes players who are internationally capped.

Touring squad
Head coach Warren Gatland named a 32-man squad following the trial match, for the two-test series against South Africa. It included 19 players from the Probables squad, 10 from the Possibles squad and three who did not feature in the trial match.

Head coach:  Warren Gatland

Note: Caps and ages are as of the date of the first test match, 14 June 2014.

South Africa
On 31 May, head coach Heyneke Meyer named a 36-man squad for the 2-test series against Wales, and the single test match against Scotland, plus the uncapped match against a World XV side.

On 2 June, Damian de Allende was withdrawn from the squad due to injury. He was replaced by Marnitz Boshoff.

On 8 June, Trevor Nyakane was added to the squad to provide further cover at prop.

Note: Caps and ages are as of the date of the first test match, 14 June 2014.

The following players were considered for selection, but not chosen due to injury or suspension.

Note: ‡ denotes players who are centrally contracted to the South African Rugby Union.

South African warm-up match
On 7 June, South Africa played an uncapped warm-up match against a World XV in Cape Town, in the lead up to the Welsh series.

References

2014
2014
2014 rugby union tours
2014 in South African rugby union
2013–14 in Welsh rugby union
History of rugby union matches between South Africa and Wales